The term insertion time is used to describe the length of time which is required to rearrange a subcritical mass of fissile material into a prompt critical mass. This is one of the three main requirements in a nuclear weapon design to create a working fission atomic bomb. The need for a short insertion time with plutonium-239 is the reason the implosion method was chosen for the first plutonium bomb, while with uranium-235 it is possible to use a gun design.

The basic requirements are:
 To start with a subcritical system
 To create a super prompt critical system
 To make the change between these two states in a length of time (insertion time) which is shorter than the time between the random appearance of a neutron in the fissile material through spontaneous fission or by other random processes.
 Also at the right moment in time, neutrons must be injected into the fissile material to start up the fission process. This can be done by several methods.
 Alpha emitters such as polonium or plutonium-238 can be rapidly combined with beryllium to create a neutron source.
 Neutrons can be generated using an electrostatic discharge tube, this tube uses the D-T reaction.

References

Nuclear weapons
Nuclear physics
Nuclear technology